Ischnopoda is a genus of beetles belonging to the family Staphylinidae.

Species:
 Ischnopoda constricta (Erichson, 1837)
 Ischnopoda atra (Gravenhorst, 1806)
 Ischnopoda leucopus (Marsham, 1802)
 Ischnopoda scitula (Erichson, 1837)

References

Staphylinidae
Staphylinidae genera